Ernest Dawson (1 December 1882, in San Antonio, Texas – 15 November 1947, in Los Angeles) was an American antiquarian bookseller, small press publisher, mountain climber, and Sierra Club president.

Ernest Dawson, born in Texas, moved in 1885 with his parents and siblings to San Luis Obispo, California.

In 1905 he founded Dawson's Book Shop, a bookstore located at 713 South Broadway in Los Angeles. In 1909 he married Sadie Alena Roberts (1883–1967). In 1912, Dawson's Book Shop published a catalogue (No. 15) with 211 titles. He sold the business in 1912 but repurchased it in 1917. In 1922 he moved the store to 627 South Grand Avenue in Los Angeles. In the 1930s his sons Glen (1912–2016) and Muir (1921–2005) began helping in the business. In the early 1940s the Press for Dawson's Book Shop published print runs of several books. When he died in 1947, his sons Glen and Muir took over the business.

Ernest Dawson was an active climber and expedition leader in the Sierra Nevada and in southern California. He was a Sierra Club director from 1922 to 1925 and from 1926 to 1937 (and also president from 1935 to 1937). In 1928 he and his 15-year-old son Glen, accompanied by two guides, climbed the Matterhorn.

References

1882 births
1947 deaths
Sierra Club directors
Sierra Club presidents
American mountain climbers
American rock climbers
American booksellers